Hydrophilus palpalis is a species of water scavenger beetles belonging to the Hydrophilinae subfamily.

Some authors have included this species in a distinct genus (Diboloceus), but most of them consider Diboloceus just a subgenus of Hydrophilus (Hydrophilus (Dibolocelus) palpalis).

Description and behavior
This large species has an oval and moderately convex body. The basic color of the body is dark brown or black. Antennae are 9-segmented. Prosternum is well developed, divided into two lobes. Elytra show ten extremely fine striae. Hind femora are glabrous.

These beetles are adapted for aquatic life. The first-stage larvae and the adults are excellent swimmers. Adults are mainly vegetarian while the larvae are carnivorous and have a preference for molluscs.

Distribution and habitat
This species can be found in South America in aquatic habitat, especially in rice cultivations (Oryza sativa).

Bibliography
Marcia Maria Dosciatti de Oliveira - Hydrophilus (Dibolocelus) palpalis Brullé, 1838 (Coleoptera, Hydrophilidae) – Ciclo vital y datos biogeográficos sobre las otras especies del subgênero
Márcia M. D. de Oliveira; Cristiano Dalla-Rosa; Leonardo H. Matias; Juan A. R. Cueto Hydrophilus (Dibolocelus) palpalis (Coleoptera, Hydrophilidae, Hydrophilinae): description of the immature stages Iheringia, Sér. Zool. vol.94 no.4 Porto Alegre Dec. 2004

References

Hydrophilinae
Beetles described in 1838